The Ohio State University at Mansfield is a satellite campus of Ohio State University in Mansfield, Ohio. It was founded in 1958 as a land-grant college and occupies a  campus that is shared with North Central State College. The campus offers ten bachelor degree programs and graduate level coursework in education. The campus practices open admissions. Students can start at Mansfield and finish their degrees at The Ohio State University, Columbus, with one or more of Ohio State’s 200+ majors. The Bromfield Library of the Ohio State Mansfield campus provides access to all the resources of the Ohio State University and Ohio Link.

History
The Ohio State University at Mansfield was founded in 1958 as a land-grant college and was created through a partnership between Mansfield-area citizens and the state of Ohio. Soon after the Ohio Board of Regents designated Mansfield as the site for an Ohio State regional campus, Mansfield-area citizens mounted a major campaign to acquire land for the campus.

OSU-Mansfield, in 1989, hosted a weekend school for Japanese students.

Student life

Student organizations
There are about 30 student organizations on the Mansfield Campus.

Department of Athletics and Recreation 

Ohio State Mansfield is a member of the Ohio Regional Campus Conference. The 4 sponsored varsity sports are: Men's Baseball, Women's Soccer, Men's Basketball, Women's Basketball, Cheerleading (Club).

Intramural sports vary from year to year based on interest levels,
In Fall: Flag Football, Sand Volleyball, and Tennis.
In Winter: Dodgeball and Kickball.
In Spring: Basketball, Sand Volleyball, Soccer, Softball, and Tennis.

References

External links

 
 

Mansfield Campus, Ohio State University
Educational institutions established in 1958
Education in Richland County, Ohio
Buildings and structures in Mansfield, Ohio
1958 establishments in Ohio